Sir Robert Davers, 2nd Baronet may refer to:

Sir Robert Davers, 1st Baronet (c. 1620–1685), of the Davers baronets
Sir Robert Davers, 2nd Baronet (c. 1653–1722), MP for Bury St Edmunds and Suffolk
Sir Robert Davers, 3rd Baronet (c. 1684–1723), of the Davers baronets
Sir Robert Davers, 5th Baronet (c. 1730–1763), of the Davers baronets

See also
Davers (surname)